Hoyt Patrick Taylor Sr. (June 11, 1890 – April 12, 1964) was the 21st Lieutenant Governor of North Carolina from 1949 to 1953.

Early life
Taylor was born in Winton, North Carolina on June 11, 1890 to Simeon P. and Kate (Ward) Taylor.

Education
Taylor attended Winton Academy, Winton High School, Horner Military School and Wake Forest College.

Family life
In 1923 Taylor married Inez Wooten of Chadbourn. They had three children: Hoyt Patrick Taylor Jr., Caroline Corbett Taylor, and Frank Wooten Taylor. Hoyt Patrick "Pat" Taylor Jr. was also elected Lt. Governor, twenty years after his father.

Military service
Taylor served as a second lieutenant in the 371st Infantry during World War I and received the Silver Star and Purple Heart as well as a personal citation from General John Joseph Pershing.

Business career
For many years Taylor practiced law in Wadesboro, North Carolina, for a time in partnership with Congressman A. Paul Kitchin.

Early political career
A Democrat, Taylor served as mayor of Wadesboro, as chairman of the Anson County Democratic Executive Committee, as a member of the North Carolina Senate (sessions of 1936, 1937, 1938, 1939, and 1943), and as legislative assistant to Governor Robert Gregg Cherry (1945).

Taylor served as a trustee of the University of North Carolina at Chapel Hill and Meredith College.

End Notes

References 
 Hoyt Patrick Taylor, Sr., Papers at East Carolina University
 OurCampaigns.com

1890 births
1964 deaths
Lieutenant Governors of North Carolina
North Carolina state senators
Wake Forest University alumni
Federal Bureau of Investigation agents
Recipients of the Silver Star
Meredith College people
North Carolina lawyers
People from Winton, North Carolina
People from Wadesboro, North Carolina
Military personnel from North Carolina
American military personnel of World War I
20th-century American politicians